Beaver Dam State Park is an Illinois state park on  in Macoupin County, Illinois in the United States.

The state park centers on the  Beaver Dam Lake, an artificial reservoir which was created by a private Carlinville fishing club in the 1890s.  The club later became a private resort which catered to visitors who arrived via the adjacent Chicago and Alton Railroad.  During the Great Depression, the resort failed.  The state of Illinois purchased the lake and some adjacent property in 1947.  Additional land purchases have created the present-day Beaver Dam State Park.

The IDNR manages Beaver Dam Lake for the fishing of largemouth bass, bluegill, channel catfish, and sunfish.  In addition, the park offers opportunities for the hunting of deer, wild turkey, and small game.  There is a power limit for boats using the Beaver Dam Lake reservoir, with no gasoline-powered motors allowed.

Beaver Dam State Park preserves part of the historic oak-hickory forests that line upper Macoupin Creek. The reservoir and park drain into a tributary of Macoupin Creek.

References

External links

Protected areas of Macoupin County, Illinois
State parks of Illinois
Protected areas established in 1947
1947 establishments in Illinois